Big Branch Marsh National Wildlife Refuge was formed in 1994. This diverse habitat is an example of the natural coastline of Lake Pontchartrain surrounded by fast developing communities.

Wildlife
Endangered wildlife in the refuge are red-cockaded woodpecker, bald eagle and brown pelican. Other wildlife include rabbit, turkey, various neo-tropical birds, deer, squirrel, migratory waterfowl, and wading birds.

Habitat
The refuge has unique habitat zones that contain diverse combinations of plant communities. These zones begin with the sandy beach fringing Lake Pontchartrain. Moving inland, the next zone is the brackish marsh. The third zone has a water level that is slightly below the marsh floor and the predominant plants are wiregrass and spike rush. The farthest inland plant zone is the upland zone and it consists of pine flatwoods and bottomland hardwood hammocks.

Hurricane damage
The facilities at Big Branch Marsh NWR were damaged by Hurricane Katrina. The Boy Scout Road Trail boardwalk was destroyed but a new and improved boardwalk was built in early 2007. Other facilities on the refuge have been repaired or rebuilt. Sections of marsh vegetation were damaged and thousands of trees were destroyed or damaged. Trees were replanted on the refuge in 2006, 2007, and 2008. A marsh restoration project took place 2008 in the Goose Point and Point Platte areas, and Christmas tree fences were placed in some areas of the marsh. Discarded Christmas trees placed in these fences slow wave action, trap sediments, and combat erosion.

See also
List of National Wildlife Refuges: Louisiana

References

External links
Big Branch Marsh National Wildlife Refuge
Refuge profile

National Wildlife Refuges in Louisiana
Protected areas of St. Tammany Parish, Louisiana
Protected areas established in 2001
Marshes of the United States
Landforms of St. Tammany Parish, Louisiana
Wetlands and bayous of Louisiana